Colonel William Logan Crittenden (1823–1851) was a United States Army officer who fought in the Mexican–American War and later accompanied Narciso López's 1851 filibustering Lopez Expedition in Cuba. He was captured by Spanish forces and executed in Havana on August 16, 1851.

Early life 
Crittenden was born to Henry and Anna Marie (Allen) Crittenden in 1823. His brother was Thomas Theodore Crittenden, who became Governor of Missouri in 1881 and issued a bounty for Jesse James. At the time of Crittenden's participation in the López expedition, his uncle, John J. Crittenden, was serving as Attorney General of the United States.

Crittenden's paternal grandfather was John Crittenden, who served as a major with the Virginia militia in the American Revolution and was one of the first settlers in Kentucky. His maternal grandfather was John Allen, a Kentucky soldier who was killed in action at the Battle of Frenchtown in 1813. Through Allen, he was also a descendant of Benjamin Logan, an early Kentucky pioneer.

Military career 
Crittenden attended the Military Academy at West Point, and after graduation, served in the Mexican War. After the war, he resigned his commission and, in 1851, joined López's expedition to liberate Cuba from Spanish rule. The expedition departed New Orleans on August 3, 1851 on the steamer Pampero. The filibusters disembarked at the village of Morillos on August 12. Upon their arrival, however, they found little support among the local Cuban population and López traveled inland, leaving Crittenden in command of a force of 100 men. Spanish forces quickly surrounded Crittenden's troops, who desperately tried to escape the island in four small fishing boats. They were quickly captured by the Spanish steamer Habanero on the 15th. Crittenden and 50 of his men were taken to Havana and executed as pirates on August 16.

Americans in both the north and the south were infuriated when news of the executions reached the States. Even if they disapproved of the filibusters' breach of neutrality, many Americans saw the response of the Spanish officers as unnecessarily brutal. In New Orleans, growing anti-Spanish sentiment resulted in riots that attacked the Spanish consulate in the city. However, the U.S. government refused to officially protest Spain's actions, maintaining that the expedition had been an illegal operation.

Crittenden became a martyr and  folk hero to the people in Kentucky in the years following his death. A popular story purported that he had refused to be blindfolded or kneel to his executioners, proclaiming that "A Kentuckian always faces his enemy and kneels only to his God."

See also 
 Ostend Manifesto
 Cuba-United States Relations

References

External links 
 Executed Today, 1851: Col. William Logan Crittenden, nephew of the Attorney General

1823 births
1851 deaths
American filibusters (military)
American people executed abroad
19th-century executions of American people